The 2008 MBC Drama Awards is a ceremony honoring the outstanding achievement in television on the Munhwa Broadcasting Corporation (MBC) network for the year of 2008. It was held on December 30, 2008 and hosted by Shin Dong-yup and actress Han Ji-hye.

Nominations and winners
(Winners denoted in bold)

References

External links
http://www.imbc.com/broad/tv/ent/event/2008mbc/

MBC Drama Awards
MBC Drama Awards
MBC Drama Awards